Fernando Gómez may refer to:
 Fernando Fernán Gómez (1921–2007), Spanish actor and director
 Fernando Gómez Agudelo (1931–1993), Colombian lawyer and television industry pioneer
 Fernando R. Gómez (born 1940), founder of the Museo de Historia del Mormonismo en Mexico
 Fernando Gómez Esparza (born 1953), Mexican politician
 Fernando Gomez-Bezares (born 1956), Spanish economist
 Fernando Gómez Mont (born 1963), Mexican lawyer and politician
 Fernando Gómez (footballer, born 1965), Spanish retired footballer
 Fernando Gómez-Reino (born 1965), Spanish former swimmer
 Fernando Gómez Doblas (born 1965), Spanish track and field athlete 
 Nando Gómez (born 1984), Spanish footballer born Fernando Gómez Herrera
 Fernando Gómez (athlete), Spanish Paralympic athlete
 Raúl Fernando Gómez Circunegui, Uruguayan man who survived a four-month ordeal in the Andes mountain-range

See also
 Fernando Gomes (disambiguation)